The 2002–03 Macedonian First League was the 11th season of the Macedonian First Football League, the highest football league of Macedonia. The first matches of the season were played on 10 August 2002 and the last on 1 June 2003. Vardar defended their championship title, having won their fifth title, second in a row.

Promotion and relegation

Participating teams

League table

Results
Every team will play three times against each other team for a total of 33 matches. The first 22 matchdays will consist of a regular double round-robin schedule. The league standings at this point will then be used to determine the games for the last 11 matchdays.

Matches 1–22

Matches 23–33

Top goalscorers

Source: rsssf.org

See also
2002–03 Macedonian Football Cup
2002–03 Macedonian Second Football League

External links
Macedonia - List of final tables (RSSSF)
Football Federation of Macedonia

Macedonia
1
Macedonian First Football League seasons